The Kundert Medical Clinic is a building in San Luis Obispo, California, United States, designed by Frank Lloyd Wright and was completed in 1956. It is notable for being one of the few commercial buildings designed by Wright.

Dr. Karl Kundert and his tenant, Dr. Fogo, were both ophthalmologists from Wisconsin and were familiar with Wright's work. (Storrer, 425) The construction of the building was supervised by Wright protégé, Aaron Green. 

This building is now occupied by cardiologist Kenneth Tway, MD.

References

 Storrer, William Allin. The Frank Lloyd Wright Companion. University Of Chicago Press, 2006.  (S.396)

External links
About.com Listing
Kundert Clinic entry on the official Wright website 

Kundert Medical Clinic